Charallave is a city in the state of Miranda, Venezuela, and part of Miranda's Valles del Tuy region. It is the capital of Cristóbal Rojas Municipality. The name derives from the local Charavares indigenous people found at the time the city was founded.

The city is connected to Caracas' public transport system via two train stations, Charallave Norte (Generalísimo Francisco de Miranda) and Charallave Sur (Don Simon Rodríguez).

Cities in Miranda (state)
Populated places established in 1681
1681 establishments in the Spanish Empire